Dicrogamasus is a genus of mites in the family Parasitidae.

Species
 Dicrogamasus imus (Tikhomirov, 1971)     
 Dicrogamasus propinquus (Tikhomirov, 1971)     
 Dicrogamasus theodori (Costa, 1961)

References

Parasitidae